Marcelo Ríos defeated Àlex Corretja in the final, 6–4, 6–3, 6–3 to win the singles tennis title at the 1997 Monte Carlo Open.

Thomas Muster was the two-time defending champion, but lost in the second round to Fabrice Santoro.

Seeds
The top eight seeds received a bye to the second round.

  Pete Sampras (second round)
  Thomas Muster (second round)
  Yevgeny Kafelnikov (second round)
  Richard Krajicek (quarterfinals)
  Thomas Enqvist (second round)
  Carlos Moyà (semifinals)
  Marcelo Ríos (champion)
  Wayne Ferreira (second round)
  Boris Becker (first round)
  Álbert Costa (third round)
  Félix Mantilla (second round)
  Álex Corretja (final)
  Jim Courier (second round)
  Alberto Berasategui (second round)
  Marc Rosset (second round)
  Sergi Bruguera (third round)

Draw

Finals

Top half

Section 1

Section 2

Bottom half

Section 3

Section 4

External links
 ATP Singles draw

Singles